Pope Julian (Yulianus) of Alexandria was the 11th Pope and Patriarch of Alexandria.

Julian was known as a wise priest, studying the Bible and "walking in the path of chastity and religion and tranquility". A synod of bishops, together with the laity, in the city of Alexandria, Egypt, appointed him patriarch. He composed homilies and sermons on the saints. The bishop of Alexandria did not always remain in that city, but travelled secretly, and ordained priests in every place, as Saint Mark, the evangelist, had done.

After a reign of ten years, Julian died on the 8th of Paremhat, or on the 12th of Babah. He is commemorated in the Coptic Synaxarion on the 8th day of Paremhat.

References 

General

Atiya, Aziz S. The Coptic Encyclopedia. New York: Macmillan Publishing Co., 1991.

External links 
 The Official website of the Coptic Orthodox Pope of Alexandria and Patriarch of All Africa on the Holy See of Saint Mark the Apostle
 Coptic Documents in French

188 deaths
Saints from Roman Egypt
2nd-century Popes and Patriarchs of Alexandria
2nd-century Christian saints
Year of birth unknown